The Gnome King of Oz (1927) is the twenty-first in the series of Oz books created by L. Frank Baum and his successors, and the seventh by Ruth Plumly Thompson. Like nineteen of the twenty previous books, it was illustrated by John R. Neill.

Plot
Patch is the country of the Quilties, a land of seamstresses and quiltmakers; it lies in the Quadling quadrant of Oz. Its people have a serious problem. Their queen, Cross Patch the Sixth, has gone to pieces—literally; small pieces too. To find her successor, the land's Chief Scrapper and Prime Piercer unwind the Spool of Succession, and follow where the golden thread leads. It leads, in this instance, to the Emerald City, where it selects Scraps, the Patchwork Girl of Oz (first introduced in her eponymously titled novel, the seventh Oz book by L. Frank Baum) to be the new queen. The two Quilties, used to resistance from Queens-to-be (it's not that good a job), kidnap Scraps.
  
Meanwhile, Peter Brown, a boy from Philadelphia, is transported by a balloon bird to the Runaway Island, where Ruggedo, the wicked Gnome King has been exiled for five years (see Kabumpo in Oz). A seaquake reveals the  sunken pirate ship of Polacky the Plunderer—which contains the magic chest of Soob the Sorcerer. The chest holds several magic treasures, including a magic cloak that is supposed to render the wearer invisible and teleport him anywhere he chooses. But the cloak is torn and does not work. The ship, however, derelict as it is, allows Peter and Ruggedo to drift to the Land of Ev.

Promising to make Peter a general in his army, Ruggedo returns to the Gnome Kingdom and forces the current king, Kaliko, to abdicate in his favor.  Ruggedo's plan is to have the cloak mended, then use it to fly to the Emerald City and recover his magic belt, with all its power — but he learns that the tricky repair job can only be done properly by the expert tailors in Patch.  With Peter, he makes his way to Patch, where he offers Peter as a slave in return for the repair of the cloak.  The Patch ministers accept this offer and the cloak is repaired.

Peter meets Scraps and makes other new friends, including Grumpy the Bear and Ozwold the Ostrich.  Together they escape from Patch and set out for the Emerald City in order to warn Ozma about Ruggedo's plans.  Meanwhile, using the power of the repaired cloak, Ruggedo becomes invisible and teleports to the Emerald City, where he causes some mischief before Peter arrives.  Still invisible, Ruggedo steals the magic belt.  He is about to use its powers to teleport Ozma and her friends to the bottom of the ocean, but Peter overcomes him by throwing a "silence stone", one of the treasures he had taken from the sunken pirate ship, at Ruggedo's head, which robs Ruggedo of the power of speech.  Since the magic belt only responds to spoken commands, this renders Ruggedo harmless, and the Wizard of Oz makes him visible again. Ozma makes Peter a Prince of Oz, but the boy chooses to return to Philadelphia; he can't let down his team.

References

External links

 Full text of The Gnome King of Oz at the Internet Archive

Oz (franchise) books
1927 American novels
1927 fantasy novels
1927 children's books